Nuuk Municipality was one of the municipalities of Greenland until 31 December 2008. On 1 January 2009, it was merged with four other former municipalities into the new Sermersooq municipality. The central town was Nuuk. Other settlements within its borders were Kangerluarsoruseq (now abandoned), Kapisillit and Qeqertarsuatsiaat.

Former municipalities of Greenland